Tilletia laevis is a plant pathogen that causes bunt on wheat.

It was used as a biological weapon by Iraq against Iran during the Iran–Iraq War in the 1980s.

References

External links 
 Index Fungorum
 USDA ARS Fungal Database

Ustilaginomycotina
Fungal plant pathogens and diseases
Wheat diseases
Fungi described in 1873